Golden is the fourteenth studio album by Australian singer Kylie Minogue, released on 6 April 2018 by Darenote and BMG Rights Management. The album was co-produced by Minogue alongside a variety of producers including Ash Howes, Richard "Biff" Stannard, Sky Adams, Alex Smith, and Mark Taylor, among others. Each track was co-written by Minogue, making it her first album since Impossible Princess (1997) in which this was the case. A large portion of the record was recorded in Nashville, Tennessee, where she found new inspiration with its music, and also recorded some material in London and Los Angeles.

Musically, Golden is a pop record that is heavily influenced by country pop and dance-pop music. Described by Minogue as one of her most personal efforts, the lyrics encompass a wide range of themes including failed relationships, death, escape, family and freedom. Upon its release, Golden received generally positive reviews from music critics, a majority of whom commended Minogue's honesty and personality through her songwriting skills, as well as its catchiness. However, critics were divided by the composition and her experimentation with country music. Commercially, the album entered the top twenty in several markets, reaching number one in Australia, Scotland and the UK.

The album produced six singles including "Dancing", which was released as the album's lead single on 19 January 2018 to critical acclaim and moderate commercial success, with some highlighting the song as one of Minogue's best singles to date. As well as appearing on several shows such as Saturday Night Takeaway, The Graham Norton Show and The Late Late Show with James Corden, Minogue embarked on two concert tours in order to further promote Golden. A promotional tour, Kylie Presents Golden, commenced in March 2018 and consisted of six shows in smaller venues. In September of the same year, the Golden Tour commenced, consisting of 33 arena shows across Europe and Australia.

Background and production
In 2016, Kylie Minogue released her final studio album with long-term record label Parlophone, entitled Kylie Christmas: Snow Queen Edition—which was a re-packaging of the singer's original studio album a year prior. Between 2014 and 2017, Minogue continued to use herself as a featuring artist to the works of Giorgio Moroder and Fernando Garibay, and eventually expanded her work with film and television. In February 2017, Minogue's own company Darenote signed a new record deal with BMG Rights Management to release her new music, with Minogue retaining the rights to the material. In December 2017, Minogue and BMG had struck a joint-deal with Mushroom Music Labels—under the sub-division label Liberator Music to release her new album in Australia and New Zealand.

Throughout that year, Minogue worked with writers and producers for her fourteenth studio album including Amy Wadge, Sky Adams, DJ Fresh, Nathan Chapman, and teamed with previous collaborators Richard Stannard, The Invisible Men and Karen Poole. Early production started in London and Los Angeles, and eventually ended with her recording a majority of the album's content in Nashville, Tennessee. She commented about the process and inspiration in these locations in October 2017, stating; "I did a lot of work on the album before that but Nashville had a profound effect on me." Additionally, Minogue co-wrote every song on Golden, the first time she has done so since Impossible Princess (1997). Minogue described the songwriting process in the latter location as "therapy".

Composition

Minogue commented that the content of Golden was originally "synth-pop dance songs" that her fans would "expect from her". However, her A&R manager had suggested incorporating country music into the record, which she acknowledged positively. She travelled to Nashville in July 2017 for two weeks to record four songs, and explained that it "all started to make sense. We managed to find this country inspiration but bring it back into my world." She described the result as being "Dolly Parton standing on a dance floor". During the songwriting process, Minogue "kept writing songs" without intention, and found the results to be very "cathartic"; additionally, the singer believed the song's lyrics came off more "authentic" and "story-telling" than her previous music.

The album opens with the lead single "Dancing", a dance-pop and country hybrid that does not include a bridge section. Lyrically, it deals with Minogue's view on death, with the lyrics "When I go out, I wanna go out dancing," describing how the singer wants to feel in that situation before death. "Stop Me from Falling" includes a similar sound, but "bristles with good-time handclaps and a goshdarn toe-tappin' basslines," along with instrumentation of a banjo. The title track, a self-empowerment anthem, was described as a take on soundtracks from Spaghetti Western films, namely referencing Ennio Morricone's theme song to The Good, the Bad and the Ugly with the yodeling. The fourth track, "A Lifetime to Repair", is one of the album's first tracks that talks about failed relationships. Sonically, Helen Clarke from MusicOMH said the song was "structurally weird; half of it is made up of lolling country guitars and drawling vocals, the other half the glittery pop she's best known for." "Sincerely Yours", a light pop ballad, opens as a "love letter" to her fans and was musically compared to the work of Tegan & Sara for its "flimsy" strings and vocal hooks. The sixth track "One Last Kiss" was noted for its "basic" country rhythm, featuring live guitar riffs, drums and a banjo.

The seventh track "Live a Little" was compared to "Dancing" because of its blend of dance-pop and country music. The lyrics "slept by candlelight, scared of running out of time" explains her expectations of age, and wanting to feel free and have fun. "Shelby 68'" was compared to the work of Taylor Swift with its "ill-fitting Tennessee twang" and midtempo rhythm. The song has a title reference to her father's mustang and the year of Minogue's birth, and also features audio from the vehicle, recorded by Minogue's brother Brendan. "Radio On" was deemed one of the album's highlights due to its stripped production to acoustic guitars and violins. Critics noted the concentration of her "thin" vocals and how she talks about her willingness to forget a previous break-up by "listen to the radio". "Love", talks about the effects of love and even mentions previous breakups with the lyric, "lying in your lover's T-shirt". "Raining Glitter" was selected as one of the album's best tracks for utilizing her previous experimentation of dance and disco music with country music, and also described as a "joyful" and "fun" anthem. The track "combines lilting acoustic guitar, disco beats, [and] a whooping vocal effect" that was compared to the Spiritual Life / Ibadan remix of Beth Orton's "Central Reservation." The closer of the standard track list is "Music's Too Sad Without You", a collaboration with English/Italian musician Jack Savoretti. Musically, it was compared to the work of American artists Beck and Lana Del Rey.

Release
Golden was released on 6 April 2018 in physical and digital formats, and served as Minogue's first record with BMG. The album is being distributed in various formats including a standard digipak and a deluxe edition that features the bonus tracks—"Lost Without You", "Every Little Part of Me", "Rollin'" and "Low Blow"—a large 32-page coffee table book that includes the vinyl and CD, and a cassette tape. Additionally, a signed white label vinyl was released through her official website, and also featured an exclusive picture disc vinyl that is housed with an alternative cover art for Golden. On Minogue's website, the album was placed in several bundles that included various content including T-shirts, vinyl copies of the single "Dancing", and promotional pictures of the singer. A clear vinyl was issued through selected markets in the United Kingdom, limited to 4,000 copies. Furthermore, 4,000 cassette tapes were made available through the singer's website; after they sold out, an additional 1,000 copies were printed and signed personally by Minogue. After the commencement of her Golden tour in the UK, Minogue revealed a special collectors edition of the cassette that were limited to 1,500 units, featuring unreleased content that can be unveiled using Shazam.

The creative direction and design for Golden was developed by Australian art director and graphic designer Leif Podhajsky, whereas the photography was taken by British photographer Simon Emmett. In a lengthy article talking about the artwork, Idolator's Mike Wass commented, "She casually poses on a sofa with tousled hair and minimal make-up. There's even a (sequined) guitar next to her, not an instrument you would normally associate with the Queen of dance/pop."

Promotion

Minogue and BMG publicised Golden with an extensive marketing campaign ahead of and during the album's launch. She was interviewed by Graham Norton on BBC Radio 2, and performed her greatest hits on Saturday Night Takeaway, including the single "Dancing", on 24 February 2018. On 13 March, Minogue debuted "Golden", "One Last Kiss", "Radio On", "A Lifetime to Repair", "Raining Glitter", "Shelby '68" and "Sincerely Yours" at Café de Paris nightclub, during her promotional tour Kylie Presents: Golden. On 22 March, she performed a special concert for Spotify fans at Porchester Hall. The next day, she performed "Dancing" and manned the telephones on Sport Relief. On 25 March, 60 Minutes Australia aired an interview during which Minogue discussed her life, new album and personal relationships. To mark the release of the album, Minogue make an appearance on The Graham Norton Show to discuss the album and to perform "Stop Me from Falling" on 6 April. The next day, she performed a free concert on London's G-A-Y nightclub. On 9 April, Minogue talked about the album and performed "Stop Me from Falling" on The One Show. On 10 April, she travelled to Germany for an interview on ZDFmediathek. On 11 April, she was interviewed on The Project. On 12 April, Minogue was interviewed on BBC Breakfast, News Breakfast, Studio 10, Today, Sunrise, Today Extra and performed "Dancing" at the ECHO Awards. The next day, she performed again on Let's Dance Germany. On 16 April, she was interviewed on Lorraine. On 21 April, Minogue performed "Stop Me from Falling" at the Queen's Official Birthday on Royal Albert Hall. On 25 April, she was interviewed on ET Canada. On 4 May, Minogue performed on Sounds Like Friday Night. On 15 June, she performed "Islands in the Stream" on The Chris Evans Breakfast Show. On 19 July, Minogue was interviewed on Good Morning Britain and performed on The Voice Kids UK on 21 July. On 9 September, she headlined BBC Radio 2 festival at the Hyde Park. On 28 October, Minogue performed "A Lifetime to Repair" on The X Factor UK. On 10 November, she performed "Music's Too Sad Without You" with Jack Savoretti on The Jonathan Ross Show. On 24 November, she performed on Michael McIntyre's Big Show.

To promote the album in the United States, Minogue performed and was interviewed on Late Night with Seth Meyers (25 April), BUILD Series (26 April), Good Morning America (27 April), White Party Palm Strings (29 April), The Late Late Show with James Corden (30 April) and New York City LGBT Pride March (24 June).

Singles
The album spawned five singles and one promotional single. "Dancing" served as the album's lead single, on 19 January 2018, and Minogue's first single with BMG Management, with the official audio premiering on her YouTube channel that same date. It received critical acclaim from music critics for its music and production, with many of them highlighting it as one of her best singles. Commercially, the song performed moderately on record charts; it peaked at number 46 in Australia and number 38 in the United Kingdom, making "Dancing" Minogue's 51st single to make it into the UK Top 40. In addition, "Dancing" entered charts in Belgium, France, Hungary, New Zealand and Spain. In the United States, "Dancing" became her 14th number-one single on Billboards Dance Club Songs chart in its 12 May 2018 issue.

"Stop Me from Falling" was released as the second single on 9 March 2018. A live video, recorded at her Kylie Presents: Golden promotional  tour, was released on her YouTube channel on 29 March. It achieved positive commentary from music critics for its production and hooks. The single charted in the United Kingdom at number 52 and reached the top 50 in digital categories in Australia, France and Japan. One day later, on 30 March, "Raining Glitter" was released as the only promotional single, and debuted at number 188 on the French Digital Singles Chart. The song also entered and peaked on the Scotland Singles Chart at number 98 for one week. A remix version of "Stop Me from Falling" was announced by Minogue on 18 April 2018, which features Cuban musical duo Gente De Zona. A music video was shot two months prior to its announcement in Havana, Cuba.

A music video for title track "Golden" was also filmed in Cuba and, on 28 May 2018, premiered on YouTube in celebration of Minogue's 50th birthday. She later confirmed on social media that "Golden" was the third single from the album. It impacted Italian radio stations on 29 May 2018. The fourth single from the album was announced as "A Lifetime to Repair". The song was sent to radio on 4 August 2018, with the radio edit premiering on BBC Radio 2, with a digital bundle appearing on 17 August 2018. On 9 October 2018, "Music's Too Sad Without You" was announced as the album's fifth and final single in most markets. On 9 November 2018, "Sincerely Yours" received a radio release as the sixth and final single in Australia and New Zealand.

Critical reception

At Metacritic, which assigns a normalised rating out of 100 to reviews from mainstream critics, Golden has an average score of 63 based on 10 reviews, indicating "generally favorable reviews". Many critics praised Minogue's involvement in the creative process, specifically the songwriting. Mark Kennedy for The Associated Press noted how her songwriting skills have become more reflective on her life; he says, "The lyrics fit a woman who turns 50 this year — regret, bad love, hope and yearning." Cameron Adams from Australian publication News.com.au awarded the album four stars, and said "no one can say Golden is just your regular Kylie Minogue album." Nick Hasted from The Independent awarded it three stars, and believed it was better than her previous efforts because of its "authenticity", and highlighted "Shelby 68'" and "Love" for being some of the singer's most personal tracks on the record.

Tim Sendra from AllMusic labelled it a "darn bold" for an artist of Minogue's longevity, stating "The amazing thing about the album, and about Minogue, is that she pulls off the country as well as she's pulled off new wave, disco, electro, murder ballads, and everything else she's done in her long career." Sal Cinquemani from Slant Magazine awarded the album three-and-a-half stars out of five, praising Minogue's experimentation with Country music and labelled it her most "personal effort since 1997's Impossible Princess. Minor criticism was aimed at her "tinny and over-compressed" vocals on certain tracks, but ultimately concluded in saying, "Golden further bolsters Minogue's reputation for taking risks—and artfully sets the stage for her inevitable disco comeback."  MusicOMH editor Helen Clarke awarded it four stars, and commended the singer's skills through songwriting and production work. She commented, "Golden stands alongside her classic records; in a world of disposable music, Kylie's return is welcome and shows how slick, smart pop music should be done." Giving the record a positive review, Mark Kennedy from The Washington Post noted some tracks delved too heavy into the country aesthetic, but concluded "there's no denying Minogue's overall skill, as usual. She's earned the right to dabble in anything she wants, and she does it very well here."

Conversely, Ian Gormely of Exclaim! gave Golden 6 out of 10 score, and stated that the album "is bereft of relative stinkers, but there's little to bring listeners back." Although complimenting her songwriting skils and incorporation of pop music, The Independent writer Nick Hasted believed "the Nashville experiment [on Golden] is finally too half-hearted for the desired transformation." Pitchfork editor Ben Cardew agreed, and explained that on Golden, "sounds like someone playing at country music, rather than someone who understands it." He did acknowledge Kylie's personality in driving the record, but concluded that he "hopes country Kylie is short-lived." Laura Snapes of The Guardian described the record as "a flawed yet deeply admirable album". In reference the album's "unsettling, fatalistic" themes, Snapes added that "Kylie's emotional credibility is startling". Larry Bartleet from NME felt the best tracks happened "when country serves as a delicate seasoning for Kylie's pop chops," and identified "Dancing" and "Raining Glitter" as examples. Elsewhere, Barleet believed the remaining work "strays perilously close to pastiche." In a negative review, Joe Muggs from The Arts Desk awarded in two stars, and felt the production and Kylie's songwriting were overshadowed by "bombast" of musical styles. He stated that "Kylie very likely does have a great album (or albums) still in her, but imitating artists half her age really isn't the way to get to them."

Commercial performance
Golden debuted at number one in the United Kingdom on 13 April, with 48,032 album-equivalent units; 1,870 of those units were taken from sales-equivalent streams as reported by Music Week. The album became Minogue's sixth number one on the UK Albums Charts and her first since Aphrodite in 2010. Golden outsold its closest competitor and previous week's number one, The Greatest Showman: Original Motion Picture Soundtrack, by 13,000 units according to the Official Charts Company. The album also debuted at number-one on the UK Vinyl Albums Chart. With 6,400 records sold, Golden became the fastest selling vinyl album of 2018 in the UK. Furthermore, Golden also became the fastest-selling cassette of the year and in its first week of release already outsold the best-selling artist album cassette of 2017. Prior to the album's release, Adam Sherwin of i News noted that all 4,000 of the limited edition Golden cassettes had already sold out on pre-release orders, with Minogue's first week cassette sales in the UK amounting to 2,600 according to the Official Charts Company. Sherwin noted the audio format, once considered "obsolete", was experiencing a revival thanks to a new audience of "hipsters and music nostalgists" who enjoy the "coffee table appeal" of cassettes.

In her native Australia, Golden debuted at number one on the ARIA Albums Chart, with 8,745 sales, becoming her fifth studio album to debut atop the chart, and therefore made Golden Minogue's first album to peak atop the chart in both the United Kingdom and Australia in 17 years, a feat she first accomplished in 2001 with Fever. Subsequently, it opened atop of the Australian Artist Albums Chart and the country's Digital Albums Chart. In New Zealand, it became the singer's fifth album to reach the top twenty with a peak at number 16 on their regional chart. In Japan, Golden opened at number 14 on the daily Oricon Albums Chart and, by 16 April 2018, end up at number 64 on their weekly chart with physical sales of 1,052 units. Furthermore, it opened at number 10 on their Western Albums Chart, and number 18 on their Digital Albums Chart with 586 digital units in the first week. The album debuted at number 64 on the US Billboard 200, the singer's ninth appearance and her first-recognised independent release in the country. It opened with 10,000 album-equivalent units, of which 8,000 were in traditional album sales. It also reached number 33 on the Canadian Albums Chart, provided by Billboard.

In Italy, the album opened at number 14 on Italian Albums Chart, making it Minogue's fourth album to reach the top 20 in Italy. In France, Golden opened at number 33 on their national albums chart. The album debuted at number 14 and number six on their physical and digital albums chart, accumulating 2,800 overall sales in its first week; this was considered a drop in contrast to her 2014 album Kiss Me Once, which shifted 6,400 copies. In Belgium, it debuted at number four and number 12 on their individual Flanders and Wallonia albums chart. In Scandinavian regions, Golden opened at number 38 on the Swedish Albums Chart and number 47 on the Finnish Albums Chart. In Germany, it opened at number three on their albums chart, making it her second-highest charting album alongside Aphrodite, and just under 2001's Fever. In the Netherlands, the record debuted at number 18 on their overall albums chart, and entered their vinyl chart at number six.

Track listing
Credits adapted from album liner notes.

Notes

  signifies a remixer
 Until July 2020, the Collector's Edition cassette provided access to an unlisted YouTube video, which was a live version of the song "New York City".
 For a limited time, the Christmas Collector's Edition cassette provided online access to a video message from Minogue.

Personnel
Performers and musicians

 Kylie Minogue – lead vocals, backing vocals
 Jack Savoretti – lead vocals 
 Sky Adams - backing vocals , guitar , fiddle 
 Nathan Chapman – background vocals 
 Seton Daunt - guitar , keyboards 
 Samuel Dixon - guitar , piano , bass guitar 
 Jesse Frasure - synthesizer , piano , drums , bass guitar 
 Jon Green - backing vocals , piano , acoustic guitar , electric guitar , bass , keyboards 
 Kiris Houston - guitar , banjo , fiddle , slide guitar 
 Ash Howes - keyboards 
 Steve McEwan - backing vocals , guitar , banjo , guitar , bass guitar 
 Tom Meadows - drums/percussion 
 Ron Minogue - recording of Shelby GT 350 
 Emre Ramazanoglu - drums 
 Lindsay Rimes - backing vocals , guitar , keyboard 
 Davide Rossi - strings 
 Danny Shah - backing vocals , guitar 
 Alex Smith - backing vocals 
 Richard Stannard - keyboards 
 Michael Stockwell - guitar , bass guitar 
 Mark Taylor - backing vocals 
 Amy Wadge - backing vocals 
 Eg White - backing vocals , synthesizer , bass guitar , acoustic guitar , autoharp 

Technical

 Sky Adams - mixing , music production 
 Seton Daunt - additional guitar programming , additional programming , music co-production 
 Samuel Dixon - music production 
 Jesse Frasure - mixing , music production 
 Jon Green - engineering , music production 
 Ash Howes - mixing , music production 
 Savvas Iosifidis - mixing 
 Guy Massey - mixing 
 Emre Ramazanoglu - mixing 
 Lindsay Rimes - mixing , music production 
 Davide Rossi - strings arrangement 
 Alex Smith - music production 
 Richard Stannard - mixing , music co-production 
 Mark Taylor - music production 
 Cenzo Townshend  - mixing 
 Eg White - drum programming , mixing , music production 

Design
 Leif Podhajsky - creative direction, design
 Simon Emmett - photography

Charts

Weekly charts

Year-end charts

Certification

|-
|}

Release history

See also

 List of number-one albums of 2018 (Australia)
 List of UK Albums Chart number ones of the 2010s
 List of UK Album Downloads Chart number ones of the 2010s
 List of Official Vinyl Albums Chart number ones
 List of number-one albums of 2018 (Australia)
 List of top 10 albums in 2018 (Australia)
 List of UK Independent Albums Chart number ones of 2018
 List of number-one digital albums of 2018 (Australia)
 List of Irish Independent Albums Chart number-one albums of 2018
 List of UK top-ten albums in 2018

Notes

References

External links
Golden at Kylie Minogue's official website.

2018 albums
Kylie Minogue albums
BMG Rights Management albums
Mushroom Records albums
Country pop albums

Albums produced by Seton Daunt
Albums produced by Samuel Dixon
Albums produced by Jesse Frasure
Albums produced by Ash Howes
Albums produced by Lindsay Rimes
Albums produced by Richard Stannard (songwriter)
Albums produced by Mark Taylor (music producer)
Albums produced by Eg White